Dharampur  is a village and market center in Kanchan Rup Municipality in Saptari District in the Sagarmatha Zone of south-eastern Nepal. It was merged in the municipality along with other 8 Villages since 18 May 2013. At the time of the 1991 Nepal census, it had a population of 3668 people residing in 673 individual households.

References

Populated places in Saptari District